Mozammel Haque is a Bangladesh Nationalist Party politician and the former Member of Parliament of Sirajganj-5.

Career
Haque is a former justice. He was elected to parliament from Sirajganj-5 as a Bangladesh Nationalist Party candidate in 2001.

References

Bangladesh Nationalist Party politicians
Living people
8th Jatiya Sangsad members
People from Sirajganj District
Year of birth missing (living people)